Kepayang is a Malay word that may refer to various plants:
Hodgsonia, a vine
Pangium edule, a tall tree